Artemev is a lunar impact crater that is located on the far side of the Moon. The rim of this crater has been modified by subsequent impacts in the vicinity, with an inward bulge along the southwest edge and a worn impact lying across the north rim. The satellite crater Artemev G is partly overlain by the southeast rim of Artemev. The crater interior is relatively flat, and marked only by tiny craterlets.

The crater Tsander lies to the southwest of Artemev. Further to the southeast is the huge walled basin Hertzprung.

Satellite craters
By convention these features are identified on lunar maps by placing the letter on the side of the crater midpoint that is closest to Artemev.

References
"Craters", at Lunar Prospector website

External links
 

Impact craters on the Moon